Fien or Feen may refer to:

Fien
 Casey Fien (born 1983), American former Major League Baseball pitcher
 Cassie Fien (born 1985), Australian marathon runner
 Nathan Fien (born 1979), New Zealand former international rugby league footballer
 Fien Delbaere (born 1996), Belgian racing cyclist
 Fien van Eynde (born 1998), Belgian racing cyclist
 Fien Troch (born 1978), Belgian film director, producer and screenwriter

Feen
 Maas van der Feen (1888–1973), Dutch tennis player
 Paul van der Feen (born 1978), Dutch saxophonist

Feminine given names